SDM Domino Bratislava is a Slovak football team, based in the town of Ružinov. The club was founded in 1993.

History 
LP Domino former name SDM (Community children and youth Domino) is a civic association, which through various activities, especially sports and facilitate the development of children and youth. For more than 10 years is an essential part of his work became a youth football club, which operates about 280 boys in 10 youth and two senior teams. LP Domino is a part of the Salesian Youth Centre, which operates in the Roman Catholic parish of Saint John Bosco in Bratislava – Trnávka (Ružinov). The club is currently play in 3. liga (III. level). Last season, LP Domino finished in 3rd place (Majstrovstvá regiónu), but winner ŠFK Prenaks Jablonec and runners-up ŠK Plavecký Štvrtok rejected to promotion and so promoted LP Domino.

External links 
Official website 
Former official website

References

Football clubs in Slovakia
Football clubs in Bratislava
Association football clubs established in 2001
1993 establishments in Slovakia